The 145th Battalion (New Brunswick), CEF was a unit of about 600 men in the Canadian Expeditionary Force during the First World War. Based in Moncton, New Brunswick, the unit began recruiting in late 1915 in Kent, Albert and Westmorland counties. After sailing to England in September 1916, most members of the battalion were absorbed into the 9th Reserve Battalion on October 6, 1916. The 145th Battalion (New Brunswick), CEF, had one Officer Commanding: Lieut-Col. W. E. Forbes.

The 145th Battalion (New Brunswick), CEF is perpetuated by the Royal New Brunswick Regiment.

References

 Beatty, David Pierce, Memories of the Forgotten War: The Diary of Pte. V. E. Goodwin. Port Elgin, NB: Baie Verte Editions, 1988 (includes a history of the battalion)
 Meek, John F. Over the Top! The Canadian Infantry in the First World War. Orangeville, Ont.: The Author, 1971.
 Johnson, Robert James, Riding Into War: The Memoir of a Horse Transport Driver, 1916-1919, Fredericton: Goose Lane Editions and the New Brunswick Military Heritage Project 2004.

Military units and formations of New Brunswick
Organizations based in Moncton
Battalions of the Canadian Expeditionary Force